Jean-François van Boxmeer (born 12 September 1961) is a Belgian businessman, and was the chairman of the executive board and chief executive officer (CEO) of Heineken International. In June 2020 Jean-François van Boxmeer was succeeded as CEO of Heineken International by Dolf van den Brink.

Early life and education
Van Boxmeer was born on 12 September 1961 in Ixelles, Belgium. He received a master's degree in economics from the Facultés universitaires Notre-Dame de la Paix in Namur, Belgium in 1984.

Career
Van Boxmeer joined Heineken International in 1984, when he worked as a trainee in the Netherlands until 1987. He then worked for Heineken in Rwanda, the Democratic Republic of the Congo, Poland and Italy. He served as general manager of Heineken Italia from 2000 to 2001, and has been on its board of directors since 2001. In 2005, he was appointed chairman of the board and CEO. He oversaw the control of Asia Pacific Breweries. He believes the two key markets are Africa and India. At the 2011 World Economic Forum in Davos, Switzerland, he said Nigeria was safer than Greece in terms of investments.

In May 2020, Vodafone Group PLC named van Boxmeer as its new chairman.

Other activities

Corporate boards
 Mondelēz International, Member of the Board of Directors (since 2010)

Non-profit organizations
 European Round Table of Industrialists (ERT), Member
 Consumer Goods Forum, Member of the Board of Directors
 De Nederlandse Opera, Member of the Board of Governors 
 Louvain School of Management, Member of the Advisory Board

References

1961 births
Living people
Belgian businesspeople
Chairmen of Heineken International
Kraft Foods people
People from Ixelles
Université de Namur alumni